The 1984 Embassy World Indoor Bowls Championship  was held at the Coatbridge indoor bowling club, North Lanarkshire, Scotland, 7–12 February 1984.

Jim Baker won the title beating Nigel Smith in the final 21–18.

Draw and results

Men's singles

References

External links
Official website

World Indoor Bowls Championship
1984 in bowls